Savion Flagg (born May 26, 1999)  is an American professional basketball player for Lavrio of the Greek Basket League. He played college basketball for Texas A&M and Sam Houston State.

Early life and high school career
Flagg attended Alvin High School. During his final year, he averaged 31.3 points, 11.1 rebounds and 5.9 assists per game.

College career
Flagg attended Texas A&M for four seasons. As a sophomore, he averaged 13.9 points and 7.7 rebounds per game. Flagg averaged 10.4 points and 5.1 rebounds per game as a junior. As a senior, he averaged 8.8 points, 4.5 rebounds, and 2.3 assists per game. Following the season, Flagg entered the transfer portal, ultimately choosing Sam Houston State. During his final year, he earned a First-team All-WAC selection. Flagg averaged 18.6 points, 8.2 rebounds and 2.2 assists per game.

Professional career
On July 15, 2022, Flagg signed his first professional contract with Greek club Lavrio.

References

External links
Sam Houston State Bearkats bio

1999 births
Living people
American men's basketball players
American expatriate basketball people in Greece
Lavrio B.C. players
Power forwards (basketball)
Sam Houston Bearkats men's basketball players
Small forwards
Texas A&M Aggies men's basketball players